Roman Wick (born December 30, 1985) is a Swiss former professional ice hockey player. Wick played for EHC Kloten and ZSC Lions in the National League (NL) and for the Ottawa Senators of the National Hockey League (NHL). He was drafted in the fifth round (156th overall) of the 2004 NHL Entry Draft by the Senators who signed him to a one-year contract in 2010.

Internationally, Wick competed as a member of Switzerland's national team in the 2008 and 2009 IIHF World Championships, and at the 2010 and 2014 Winter Olympics.

Playing career
As a youth, Wick played in the 1999 Quebec International Pee-Wee Hockey Tournament with a team from Zürich.

Roman Wick began his hockey career in 2002 with the Kloten Flyers, for whom he had already played in the junior leagues. He played two seasons with the Flyers in the NLA before being drafted by the Ottawa Senators in the 2004 NHL Entry Draft. Wick moved to the Western Hockey League (WHL) from 2004 to 2006 with the Red Deer Rebels and the Lethbridge Hurricanes. He returned to the Kloten Flyers for the 2006–07 season. After a tryout in 2007 with the Senators, he returned again to Kloten for the 2007–08 season and played there for three seasons.

In July 2010, the Ottawa Senators signed Wick to a two-year, two-way contract. The deal had been rumored since June, but was not finalized until July 14. After September training camp, Wick was assigned to the Ottawa Senator's affiliate team Binghamton Senators of the American Hockey League (AHL). Wick was called up to Ottawa in February 2011, and played his first NHL game on February 25, 2011 in Buffalo against the Buffalo Sabres.

In 2011, he moved back to Switzerland and played again for the Kloten Flyers after having signed a three-years deal. In Summer 2012, Wick moved to the rival team ZSC Lions following financial issues that involved his former Club.

On March 6, 2014, Wick agreed to a three-year contract extension for a reported CHF 2.4 million.

International play

Wick has represented Switzerland on the international stage at the World U18 Championships in 2003, the World U20 Championship in 2005, the World Championships in 2008 and 2009, and the Olympic Games in 2010.

Career statistics

Regular season and playoffs

International

Achievements and awards
 2002 — Topscorer in the Elite Junior League
 2003 — Topscorer in the Elite Junior League
 2014 — MVP Most Valuable Player, National League A

References

External links

1985 births
Binghamton Senators players
GCK Lions players
Ice hockey players at the 2010 Winter Olympics
Ice hockey players at the 2014 Winter Olympics
EHC Kloten players
Lethbridge Hurricanes players
Living people
Olympic ice hockey players of Switzerland
Ottawa Senators draft picks
Ottawa Senators players
Red Deer Rebels players
Swiss ice hockey right wingers
ZSC Lions players
Sportspeople from the canton of St. Gallen